Back in the Day is a 2014 comedy film, directed and written by Smallville actor Michael Rosenbaum. It is distributed by Screen Media Films.  When Jim Owens makes a surprise visit to his high school reunion, all hell breaks loose. Hilarity ensues as he wrangles his now-married friends together for one last hurrah. Cruising the old strip, seeking vengeance on an old high school principal and nearly breaking up a wedding gets Jim into hot water with his friends and their wives. Back in the Day is written and directed by Michael Rosenbaum and stars Rosenbaum, Morena Baccarin, Nick Swardson, Harland Williams, Sarah Colonna, and Isaiah Mustafa. The film was produced by Kim Waltrip.

Cast
 Michael Rosenbaum as Jim Owens
 Morena Baccarin as Laurie
 Kristoffer Polaha as Len Brenneman
 Isaiah Mustafa as T
 Harland Williams as Skunk
 Emma Caulfield as Molly
 Liz Carey as Angie Kramer
 Sarah Colonna as Carol
 Nick Swardson as Ron Freeman
 Danielle Bisutti as Annette Taylor
 Jay R. Ferguson as Mark
 Mike Hagerty as Principal Teagley

Reception
On Rotten Tomatoes the film has a rating of 11% based on reviews from 9 critics, with an average rating of 3.4/10 based on 7 reviews. On Metacritic the film has a score of 7 out of 100 based on reviews from 5 critics, indicating "overwhelming dislike".

References

External links
 

2014 films
American comedy films
2014 comedy films
Films shot in New Jersey
Films shot in Indiana
2010s English-language films
2010s American films